Sergey Smirnov may refer to:
 Sergey Smirnov (politician)  (1918–2009), a Soviet state and party official
 Sergei Mikhailovich Smirnov (born 1950), Russian KGB/FSB official
 Sergei Sergeyevich Smirnov (born 1981), Russian footballer
 Sergey Sergeyevich Smirnov (1895–1947), Russian geologist
 Sergey Sergeyevich Smirnov (1915–1976), Russian writer
 Sergey Ivanovich Smirnov (1953–2006), Russian artist
 Sergey Victorovich Smirnov (1982-2020), Russian TV and voice actor
 Sergey Smirnov (shot putter) (born 1960), Soviet shot putter
 Sergey Smirnov (basketball), basketball player
 Sergei Smirnov (figure skater), Russian former pair skater
 Sergey Smirnov (rower) (born 1961), Soviet Olympic rower
 Sergey Smirnov (journalist) (born 1975), Russian journalist, editor-in-chief, MediaZona
 Sergei Smirnov, a fictional character in the anime series, Mobile Suit Gundam 00

See also
 Smirnov (surname)
 Smirnoff (surname)